= Bhatra, Bangladesh =

Bhatra
- Location in Bangladesh
- Coordinates: 23°00′19″N 90°07′51″E
- Country: Bangladesh
- Division: Barisal Division
- District: Barisal District
- Time zone: UTC+6 (Bangladesh Time)

Bhatra is a village in Barisal District in the Barisal Division of southern-central Bangladesh.
